Mihajlo Idvorski Pupin (4 October 1858 – 12 March 1935), also known as Michael Pupin, was a Serbian physicist, physical chemist and philanthropist based in the United States.

Pupin is best known for his numerous patents, including a means of greatly extending the range of long-distance telephone communication by placing loading coils (of wire) at predetermined intervals along the transmitting wire (known as "pupinization"). Pupin was a founding member of National Advisory Committee for Aeronautics (NACA) on 3 March 1915, which later became NASA, and he participated in the founding of American Mathematical Society and American Physical Society.

In 1924, he won a Pulitzer Prize for his autobiography. Pupin was elected president or vice-president of the highest scientific and technical institutions, such as the American Institute of Electrical Engineers, the New York Academy of Sciences, the Radio Institute of America, and the American Association for the Advancement of Science. He was also an honorary consul of Serbia in the United States from 1912 to 1920 and played a role in determining the borders of newly formed Kingdom of Serbs, Croats and Slovenes.

Early life and education

Mihajlo Pupin was an ethnic Serb, born on 4 October (22 September, O.S.) in the village of Idvor (in the modern-day municipality of Kovačica, Serbia) in the region of Banat, in the Military Frontier of the Austrian Empire,  1858. He always remembered the words of his mother and cited her in his autobiography, From Immigrant to Inventor (1925):

Pupin went to elementary school in his birthplace, to Serbian Orthodox school, and later to German elementary school in Perlez. He enrolled in high school in Pančevo, and later in the Real Gymnasium. He was one of the best students there; a local archpriest saw his enormous potential and talent, and influenced the authorities to give Pupin a scholarship.

Because of his activity in the "Serbian Youth" movement, which at that time had many problems with Austro-Hungarian police authorities, Pupin had to leave Pančevo. In 1872, he went to Prague, where he continued the sixth and first half of the seventh year. After his father died in March 1874, the sixteen-year-old Pupin decided to cancel his education in Prague due to financial problems and to move to the United States.

Studies in America and Ph.D.

For the next five years in the United States, Pupin worked as a manual laborer (most notably at the biscuit factory on Cortlandt Street in Manhattan) while he learned English, Greek and Latin. He also gave private lectures. After three years of various courses, in the autumn of 1879 he successfully finished his tests and entered Columbia College, where he became known as an exceptional athlete and scholar. A friend of Pupin's predicted that his physique would make him a splendid oarsman, and that Columbia would do anything for a good oarsman. A popular student, he was elected president of his class in his Junior year. He graduated with honors in 1883 and became an American citizen at the same time.

After Pupin completed his studies, with emphasis in the fields of physics and mathematics, he returned to Europe, initially the United Kingdom (1883–1885), where he continued his schooling supervised by John Tyndall at the University of Cambridge. He obtained his Ph.D. at the University of Berlin under Hermann von Helmholtz and in 1889 he returned to Columbia University to become a lecturer of mathematical physics in the newly formed Department of Electrical Engineering. Pupin's research pioneered carrier wave detection and current analysis.

He was an early investigator into X-ray imaging, but his claim to have made the first X-ray image in the United States is incorrect. He learned of Röntgen's discovery of unknown rays passing through wood, paper, insulators, and thin metals leaving traces on a photographic plate, and attempted this himself.  Using a vacuum tube, which he had previously used to study the passage of electricity through rarefied gases, he made successful images on 2 January 1896. Edison provided Pupin with a calcium tungstate fluoroscopic screen which, when placed in front of the film, shortened the exposure time by twenty times, from one hour to a few minutes. Based on the results of experiments, Pupin concluded that the impact of primary X-rays generated secondary X-rays. With his work in the field of X-rays, Pupin gave a lecture at the New York Academy of Sciences. He was the first person to use a fluorescent screen to enhance X-rays for medical purposes.  A New York surgeon, Dr. Bull, sent Pupin a patient to obtain an X-ray image of his left hand prior to an operation to remove lead shot from a shotgun injury. The first attempt at imaging failed because the patient, a well-known lawyer, was "too weak and nervous to be stood still nearly an hour" which is the time it took to get an X-ray photo at the time. In another attempt, the Edison fluorescent screen was placed on a photographic plate and the patient's hand on the screen. X-rays passed through the patients hand and caused the screen to fluoresce, which then exposed the photographic plate. A fairly good image was obtained with an exposure of only a few seconds and showed the shot as if "drawn with pen and ink." Dr. Bull was able to take out all of the lead balls in a very short time.

Pupin coils
Pupin's 1899 patent for loading coils, archaically called "Pupin coils", followed closely on the pioneering work of the English polymath Oliver Heaviside, which predates Pupin's patent by some seven years. The importance of the patent was made clear when the American rights to it were acquired by American Telephone & Telegraph (AT&T), making him wealthy. Although AT&T bought Pupin's patent, they made little use of it, as they already had their own development in hand led by George Campbell and had up to this point been challenging Pupin with Campbell's own patent. AT&T were afraid they would lose control of an invention which was immensely valuable due to its ability to greatly extend the range of long-distance telephones and especially submarine ones.

Research during the First World War
When the United States joined the First World War in 1917, Pupin was working at Columbia University, organizing a research group for submarine detection techniques.
Together with his colleagues, professors Wils and Morcroft, he performed numerous experiments with the aim of discovering submarines at Key West and New London. He also conducted research in the field of establishing telecommunications between places. During the war, Pupin was a member of the state council for research and state advisory board for aeronautics. For his work he received acclamation from President Warren G. Harding, which was published on page 386 of his autobiography.

Contributions to determining borders of Yugoslavia

By World War I, Pupin was as well-known for Serbian nationalism as science. He wrote that the assassination of Franz Ferdinand in June 1914 "was ... prepared in Vienna" when Austro-Hungarian rule in Bosnia and Herzegovina began in 1878. Pan-Serb ideology was, Pupin said, "a natural heritage of every true Serb". As a politically influential figure in America, Pupin participated in the final decisions of the Paris peace conference after the war, when the borders of the future kingdom (of Serbs, Croats and Slovenians) were drawn. Pupin stayed in Paris for two months during the peace talk (April–May 1919) on the insistence of the government.

According to the London agreement from 1915. it was planned that Italy should get Dalmatia. After the secret London agreement France, England and Russia asked from Serbia some territorial concessions to Romania and Bulgaria. Romania should have gotten Banat and Bulgaria should have gotten a part of Macedonia all the way to Skoplje.

In a difficult situation during the negotiations on the borders of Yugoslavia, Pupin personally wrote a memorandum on 19 March 1919 to American president Woodrow Wilson, who, based on the data received from Pupin about the historical and ethnic characteristics of the border areas of Dalmatia, Slovenia, Istria, Banat, Međimurje, Baranja and Macedonia, stated that he did not recognize the London agreement signed between the allies and Italy.

Mihajlo Pupin foundation

In 1914, Pupin formed "Fund Pijade Aleksić-Pupin" within the Serbian Academy of Sciences and Arts to commemorate his mother Olimpijada for all the support she gave him through life. Fund assets were used for helping schools in old Serbia and Macedonia, and scholarships were awarded every year on the Saint Sava day. One street in Ohrid was named after Mihajlo Pupin in 1930 to honour his efforts. He also established a separate "Mihajlo Pupin fund" which he funded from his own property in the Kingdom of Yugoslavia, which he later gave to "Privrednik" for schooling of young people and for prizes in "exceptional achievements in agriculture", as well as for Idvor for giving prizes to pupils and to help the church district.

Thanks to Pupin's donations, the library in Idvor got a reading room, schooling of young people for agriculture sciences was founded, as well as the electrification and waterplant in Idvor. Pupin established a foundation in the museum of Natural History and Arts in Belgrade. The funds of the foundation were used to purchase artistic works of Serbian artists for the museum and for the printing of certain publications. Pupin invested a million dollars in the funds of the foundation.

In 1909, he established one of the oldest Serbian emigrant organizations in the United States called "Union of Serbs – Sloga." The organization had a mission to gather Serbs in immigration and offer help, as well as keeping ethnic and cultural values. This organization later merged with three other immigrant societies.

Other emigrant organizations in to one large Serbian national foundation, and Pupin was one of its founders and a longtime president (1909–1926).

He also organized "Kolo srpskih sestara" (English: Circle of Serbian sisters) who gathered help for the Serbian Red Cross, and he also helped the gathering of volunteers to travel to Serbia during the First World War with the help of the Serbian patriotic organization called the "Serbian National Defense Council" which he founded and led. Later, at the start of the Second World War this organization was rehabilitated by Jovan Dučić and worked with the same goal. Pupin guaranteed the delivery of food supplies to Serbia with his own resources, and he also was the head of the committee that provided help to the victims of war. He also founded the Serbian society for helping children which provided medicine, clothes and shelter for war orphans.

Literary work

Besides his patents he published several dozen scientific disputes, articles, reviews and a 396-page autobiography under the name Michael Pupin, From Immigrant to Inventor (Scribner's, 1923). He won the annual Pulitzer Prize for Biography or Autobiography. It was published in Serbian in 1929 under the title From pastures to scientist (Od pašnjaka do naučenjaka). Beside this he also published:

Pupin Michael: Der Osmotische Druck und Seine Beziehung zur Freien Energie, Inaugural Dissertation zur Erlangung der Doctorwurde, Buchdruckerei von Gustav Shade, Berlin, June 1889.
Pupin Michael: Thermodynamics of Reversible Cycles in Gases and Saturated Vapors, John Wiley & Sons. 1894.
Pupin Michael: Serbian Orthodox Church (South Slav Monuments) J. Murray. London, 1918.
Pupin Michael: Yugoslavia. (In Association for International Conciliation Amer. Branch —Yugoslavia). American Association for International Conciliation. 1919.
Pupin Michael: The New Reformation; from Physical to Spiritual Realities, Scribner, New York, 1927.
Pupin Michael: Romance of the Machine, Scribner, New York, 1930.
Pupin Michael: Discussion by M. Pupin and other prominent engineers in Toward Civilization, edited by C. A. Beard. Longmans, Green & Co. New York, 1930.

Pupin Hall
Columbia University's Physical Laboratories building, built in 1927, is named Pupin Hall in his honor. It houses the physics and astronomy departments of the university. During Pupin's tenure, Harold C. Urey, in his work with the hydrogen isotope deuterium demonstrated the existence of heavy water, the first major scientific breakthrough in the newly founded laboratories (1931). In 1934 Urey was awarded the Nobel Prize in Chemistry for the work he performed in Pupin Hall related to his discovery of "heavy hydrogen".

Patents

Pupin released about 70 technical articles and reviews and 34 patents.

Honors and tributes

Mihajlo Pupin was:

President of the Institute of Radio Engineers, USA (1917)
President of American Institute of Electrical Engineers (1925–26)
President of American Association for the Advancement of Sciences
President of New York Academy of Sciences
Honorary member of German Electrical Society
Honorary member of American Institute of Electrical Engineers
Member of National Academy of Sciences
Member of French Academy of Sciences
Member of Serbian Academy of Sciences and Arts
Member of American Mathematical Society
Member of American Philosophical Society
Member of American Physical Society

Titles
Doctor of science, Columbia University (1904)
Honorable doctor of science, Johns Hopkins University (1915)
Doctor of science, Princeton University (1924)
Honorable doctor of science, New York University (1924)
Honorable doctor of science, Muhlenberg College (1924)
Doctor of engineering, Case School of Applied Science (1925)
Doctor of science, George Washington University (1925)
Doctor of science, Union College (1925)
Honorable doctor of science, Marietta College (1926)
Honorable doctor of science, University of California (1926)
Doctor of science, Rutgers University (1926)
Honorable doctor of science, Delaware University (1926)
Honorable doctor of science, Canyon College (1926)
Doctor of science, Brown University (1927)
Doctor of science, Rochester University (1927)
Honorable doctor of science, Middlebury College (1928)
Doctor of science, University of Belgrade (1929)
Doctor of science, University of Prague (1929)

Medals
Eliot Kresson Medal, Franklin Institute (1902)
Herbert award, French Academy of Sciences (1916)
IEEE Edison Medal, American Institute of Electrical Engineers (now IEEE) (1919)
Honorable medal, American Radio Institute (1924)
IEEE Medal of Honor (1924)
George Washington Award, Western Society of Engineers (1928)
White eagle, first degree, Kingdom of Yugoslavia (1929)
Order of the White Lion of Czech-Slovakia (1929)
John Fritz Medal, American Association of Engineering Societies (1931)[17]

Other
Pupin was pictured on the old 50 million Yugoslav dinar banknote.
Home page world web browser Google has been dedicated on 9 October 2011, to 157th birth anniversary of scientist Mihajlo Pupin. On the drawing in honor of the Pupin birth symbolically represented as a boy and a girl with two different hills talking on the phone.
The Central Radio Institute was renamed the Telecommunication and Automation Institute "Mihailo Pupin" in his honor in 1956.
A small lunar impact crater, in the eastern part of the Mare Imbrium, was named in his honor.
He also served on the board of trustees for Science Service, now known as Society for Science & the Public, from 1926 to 1929.
Honorary citizen, cities of Zrenjanin, Ohrid and Municipality of Bled
Various streets and schools across Serbia are named after him; Boulevard of Mihajlo Pupin (in capital city, Belgrade) or the tenth Belgrade gymnasium – Mihajlo Pupin, being the most famous examples.
 A road bridge over the Danube River in Belgrade was named Pupin Bridge in his honor after the vote of the citizens.

Private life
After going to America, he changed his name to Michael Idvorsky Pupin, stressing his origin. His father was named Constantine and mother Olimpijada and Pupin had four brothers and five sisters. In 1888 he married American Sarah Catharine Jackson from New York, with whom he had a daughter named Barbara Ivanka Pupin who was born in 1899 in Yonkers, New York and died on August 2, 1962 in New York. Pupin and his wife were married for eight years; she died from pneumonia at the age of 37.

Pupin had a reputation not only as a great scientist but also a fine person. He was known for his manners, great knowledge, love of his homeland and availability to everyone. Pupin was a great philanthropist and patron of the arts. He was a devoted Orthodox Christian

Mihajlo Pupin died in New York City in 1935 at age 76 and was interred at Woodlawn Cemetery, Bronx.

Legacy
He is included in The 100 most prominent Serbs.

See also

List of Serbs
Nikola Tesla
List of science and religion scholars
Memorial Complex in Idvor (Mihajlo Pupin)

References

Further reading
Michael Pupin, "From Immigrant to Inventor" (Charles Scribner's Sons, 1924)
Edward Davis, "Michael Idvorsky Pupin: Cosmic Beauty, Created Order, and the Divine Word." In Eminent Lives in Twentieth-Century Science & Religion, ed. Nicolaas Rupke (Frankfurt: Peter Lang, 2007), pp. 197–217.
Bergen Davis: Biographical Memoir of Michael Pupin, National Academy of Sciences of the United States Biographical Memoirs, tenth memoir of volume XIX, New York, 1938.
Daniel Martin Dumych, Pupin Michael Idvorsky, Oxford University Press, 2005. Accessed 11 March 2008
Lambić Miroslav: Jedan pogled na život i delo Mihajla Pupina, Univerzitet u Novom Sadu, Tehnički fakultet "Mihajlo Pupin", Zrenjanin, 1997.
S. Bokšan, Mihajlo Pupin i njegovo delo, Naučna izdanja Matice srpske, Novi Sad, 1951.
S. Gvozdenović, Čikago, Amerika i Vidovdan, Savez Srba u Rumuniji-Srpska Narodna Odbrana, Temišvar-Čikago, 2003.
J. Nikolić, Feljton Večernjih novosti, galerija srpskih dobrotvora, 2004.
P. Radosavljević, Idvorski za sva vremena, NIN, Br. 2828, 2005.
R. Smiljanić, Mihajlo Pupin-Srbin za ceo svet, Edicija – Srbi za ceo svet, Nova Evropa, Beograd, 2005.
Savo B. Jović, Hristov svetosavac Mihajlo Pupin, Izdavačka ustanova Sv. arh. sinoda, Beograd, 2004.
 Dragoljub A. Cucic, Michael Pupin Idvorsky and father Vasa Zivkovic, 150th Anniversary of the Birth of Mihajlo Pupin, Banja Luka, 2004.

External links

 Michael Pupin at IEEE History Center
 Pupin's autobiography From Immigrant to Inventor
 ... Commemorating the 150th Anniversary of the Birth of Michael Pupin ... at Tesla Memorial Society of New York
 

1858 births
1935 deaths
People from Kovačica
Serbs of Vojvodina
Serbian emigrants to the United States
American people of Serbian descent
American electrical engineers
Pulitzer Prize for Biography or Autobiography winners
Serbian scientists
Serbian inventors
American inventors
American physicists
Serbian physicists
Members of the Serbian Academy of Sciences and Arts
Members of the French Academy of Sciences
Members of the United States National Academy of Sciences
Eastern Orthodox Christians from the United States
Eastern Orthodox Christians from Serbia
Members of the Serbian Orthodox Church
Grand Officers of the Order of the White Lion
IEEE Medal of Honor recipients
Columbia School of Engineering and Applied Science alumni
Columbia School of Engineering and Applied Science faculty
IEEE Edison Medal recipients
Burials at Woodlawn Cemetery (Bronx, New York)
John Fritz Medal recipients
Columbia College (New York) alumni